Llys y Fran is a small village and parish in the community of New Moat on the southern slopes of the Preseli Mountains in Pembrokeshire, Wales. The parish includes the small settlement of Gwastad. A notable feature is Llys y Fran Reservoir and Country Park, a popular tourist attraction.

Name
The name appears as Llys-y-frân on Ordnance Survey maps as well as in legislation, and the parish has been recorded with a number of spellings including Llysyfran, Llys-y-fran, Llys-y-Frân and Llys-y-Vrân. The word llys translates into English as "court" and y frân translates as "[of] the crow".

History
The present parish church dates from the 12th century, with alterations and improvements in the ensuing centuries, and is dedicated to St Meilyr, a 6th-century Celtic saint. Llys y Fran was originally a chapelry; in the 16th century it was controlled by various landowners in the district, but it does appear (Llisvrayne) as a parish on a 1578 map. One of the church's two bells is dated 1632. By 1833 it was the parish church. It is a Grade II listed building.

The parish was in the ancient Hundred of Dungleddy in the Diocese of St David's. In 1833 the population was 202, and most of the parish was enclosed arable and pasture.

Llys y Fran parish includes the hamlet of Gwastad, where there has been a Calvinistic Methodist chapel since 1836.

There may have been a timber castle north of the church, but the remains may have been destroyed when the reservoir dam was built. The site is known as Y Castell (The Castle).

The teacher and composer William Penfro Rowlands (1860-1937) was born at Llys y Fran.

There is no collective war memorial to the individuals from the area.

It is managed by Welsh Water and is one of 81 reservoirs in Wales.

In 2008, a refurbished hydro-electric scheme was completed, raising the power output to an average of 26 kW; the original turbine generated considerably less. In 2017 Welsh Water announced a £4 million investment to enhance the park's facilities, to be completed in 2019, but in 2019 the project was put on hold when the construction company went into administration. A new construction company was appointed, with work scheduled to be completed in 2020, until which time the park and reservoir would remain closed. The redevelopment project and outdoor activity centre opened in 2021.

Reservoir and Country Park amenities

There is also a  family trail, and cycle hire is available.

The reservoir is an important fishery in South West Wales, and has hosted national and international fishing competitions. Fishing with fly or bait, from mark or boat, is possible. The lake is stocked with rainbow and brown trout.

Sailing, windsurfing, rowing and canoeing all take place on the reservoir, with various equipment available for hire. The park hosted the Welsh Dragon Boat Championships in 2014, 2015, 2016 and 2017.

The Llys-y-Fran Hillclimb is an annual event run by Swansea Motor Club.

References

External links

Dwr Cymru/Welsh Water: Llys y Frân Country Park & Reservoir

Villages in Pembrokeshire
Lakes of Wales
Bodies of water of Pembrokeshire
Motorsport venues in Wales